Ralph de Werewell was Archdeacon of Barnstaple until 1209.

References

Archdeacons of Barnstaple